Kyabram P-12 College, previously, "Kyabram High School" and later "Kyabram Secondary College" is a small high school in the country town of Kyabram, Victoria, Australia. The school has around 1200 students attending from a 20 km radius around Kyabram. The school was built in 1956. There are 127 working staff at the school.

The previously known "Ky High" was joined with merged with primary schools (Haslem St Primary and Dawes Rd Primary) in the region in early 2009, making up Kyabram P-12 College.

History

Houses 

The students at the school compete in various events, such as the annual Swimming Sports and Sports Carnival, under the banner of their respective houses which were inspired by the previous colour theme which was abolished. 

 Castles
 Pine Grove
 Allan

See also 
 List of schools in Victoria
 Victorian Certificate of Education

References

https://web.archive.org/web/20130410034314/http://www.kyabramsc.vic.edu.au/about.html

Public high schools in Victoria (Australia)
Educational institutions established in 1956
1956 establishments in Australia